Paul Edwards (born 1 October 1986) is an English former professional boxer who competed from 2008 to 2012. He held the British flyweight title from 2010 to 2011, and challenged once for the Commonwealth flyweight title in 2012.

Amateur career
Edwards won the 2006 Amateur Boxing Association British flyweight title, when boxing out of the Salisbury ABC.

Professional career
Edwards made his professional debut on 19 July 2008, winning a four-round points decision over Robert Palmer at the Olympia in Liverpool. He won his next 6 fights before facing Shinny Bayaar for the British flyweight title on 15 Dec 2010, at the Kings Hall, Belfast, Northern Ireland. Edwards won by first round technical knockout (TKO) after Bayaar suffered a cut above his left eye.

On 11 June 2011, Edwards made the first defence of his British flyweight title against Chris Edwards at the Olympia, Liverpool. Edwards lost the title by split decision, with one judges’ scorecard reading 115–114, and the other two 113–115.

On 19 May 2012, Edwards challenged Kevin Satchell for the Commonwealth flyweight title at the Aintree Equestrian Centre in Liverpool. Edwards lost via tenth-round stoppage. This would be Edwards' last fight.

Professional boxing record

References

English male boxers
Flyweight boxers
Living people
1986 births